Parliamentary elections were held in the People's Republic of the Congo on 24 September 1989. The country was a one-party state at the time, with the Congolese Party of Labour (PCT) as the sole legal party. A list of 133 candidates for the 133 seats in the People's National Assembly was put to a vote, although not all members on the list were PCT members. The list received 870,460 votes against 29,897 spoilt ballot papers, with a voter turnout of 89.6%.

Results

References

Elections in the Republic of the Congo
Congo
1989 in the Republic of the Congo
One-party elections
Single-candidate elections